Presentation Convent Senior Secondary School is an ISO-certified school in Jammu, India. It is affiliated to the Central Board of Secondary Education. It is known for its Environmental Management System (EMS) and Quality Management System (QMS). The school started at B.C. Road, Jammu by the name of St. Peter's. Later on it was shifted to Gandhi Nagar, Jammu in 1952, under the name of Presentation Convent School, as it was started by Presentation Sisters. It is a girls-only school. The school was pioneered by Sr. Patricia Kelly and Sr. Stanislaus.The motto of the school is VIRTUE and LABOUR. It is a Catholic School.

See also 
 List of Christian Schools in India
 St. Peter's School, B.C. Road

References 

Presentation Sisters schools
Catholic secondary schools in India
Primary schools in India
High schools and secondary schools in Jammu and Kashmir
Christian schools in Jammu and Kashmir
Private schools in Jammu and Kashmir
Schools in Jammu (city)